The 1953 Mississippi State Maroons football team represented Mississippi State College during the 1953 college football season. This would be the last season for head coach Murray Warmath, who was hired by Minnesota after the season, and for quarterback Jackie Parker, who went on to have a long career in the CFL. Parker would win his second SEC "Player of the Year" award by the Nashville Banner.

Schedule

References

Mississippi State
Mississippi State Bulldogs football seasons
Mississippi State Maroons football